The canton of Bavans is an administrative division of the Doubs department, eastern France. It was created at the French canton reorganisation which came into effect in March 2015. Its seat is in Bavans.

It consists of the following communes:
 
Accolans
Aibre
Allondans
Anteuil
Appenans
Arcey
Bavans
Belvoir
Berche
Beutal
Blussangeaux
Blussans
Bournois
Branne
Bretigney
Chazot
Colombier-Fontaine
Crosey-le-Grand
Crosey-le-Petit
Dampierre-sur-le-Doubs
Désandans
Dung
Échenans
Étouvans
Étrappe
Faimbe
Fontaine-lès-Clerval
Gémonval
Geney
L'Hôpital-Saint-Lieffroy
Hyémondans
L'Isle-sur-le-Doubs
Issans
Laire
Lanans
Lanthenans
Longevelle-sur-Doubs
Lougres
Mancenans
Marvelise
Médière
Montenois
Onans
Orve
Pays-de-Clerval
Pompierre-sur-Doubs
Présentevillers
La Prétière
Rahon
Randevillers
Rang
Raynans
Roche-lès-Clerval
Sainte-Marie
Saint-Georges-Armont
Saint-Julien-lès-Montbéliard
Saint-Maurice-Colombier
Sancey
Semondans
Servin
Sourans
Soye
Surmont
Valonne
Vaudrivillers
Vellerot-lès-Belvoir
Vellevans
Vernois-lès-Belvoir
Le Vernoy
Villars-sous-Écot
Vyt-lès-Belvoir

References

Cantons of Doubs